Comunero may refer to:

 Revolt of the Comuneros, a rebellion in Castile in 1520–1521
 Revolt of the Comuneros (Paraguay), a revolt in Paraguay in 1721–1735
 Revolt of the Comuneros (New Granada), a revolt in New Granada (modern Colombia) in 1779–1781.
 Comunera Province, a province in Santander Department of Colombia
 Villalar de los Comuneros, a town in Castile and León, Spain
 Comuneros (TransMilenio), a bus station in Bogotá
 Sociedad de los Caballeros Comuneros ("Society of Comunero Knights"), a secret society in Spain from 1821–1823 during the Trienio Liberal